Erbessa mimica is a moth of the family Notodontidae first described by Hering in 1925. It is found in Bolivia. The life expectancy  of the moth is around 60 to 90 days.

It is engaged in Müllerian mimicry with Josia oribia.

References

External links
Species page at Tree of Life Web Project

Notodontidae of South America